Formosat-2 (formerly known as ROCSAT-2) is a decommissioned Earth observation satellite formerly operated by the National Space Organization (NSPO) of Taiwan. It was a high-resolution photographic surveillance satellite with a daily revisit capability. Images are commercially available from Astrium (formerly Spot Image).

Launch 
Formosat-2 was launched on 19 May 2004, 17:47 UTC from Vandenberg Air Force Base aboard a Taurus XL rocket. It had been delivered to the United States in December 2003, and had a scheduled launch date on 17 January 2004. The launch was continually delayed until May 2004. Formosat-2 was decommissioned in August 2016.

See also

 National Space Organization
 2004 in spaceflight

References

External links

Earth observation satellites of Taiwan
Spacecraft launched in 2004